The railroad history of Portland, Maine, began in 1842 with the arrival of the Portland, Saco & Portsmouth Railway (PS&P). Most of the rail activity in Portland revolved around agricultural goods bound for export and import freight from Europe. Yet Maine's largest city also enjoyed 125 years of continuous passenger rail service, from 1842 until 1967, and Amtrak began serving the city in 2001. For most of Portland's history, passenger train schedules were designed with intercity travel rather than daily commuting in mind; passenger activities were mostly confined to intercity travel from Portland to Boston, Montreal, Nova Scotia, and points west.

Brief history

Portland first became a transportation hub when the Cumberland and Oxford Canal to interior Maine was completed in 1832. The first railroad reached the city 10 years later: the Portland, Saco & Portsmouth Railway (PS&P), whose joint operation with the Eastern Railroad of Massachusetts began in 1842. The PS&P's main terminal in Portland was on Commercial Street south of Union Street. Six passenger trains per day connected Portland with East Boston. The Boston & Maine Railroad (B&M) arrived in 1843 (via PS&P to Portland).

Portland businessmen led by John A. Poor believed rail connections with Boston threatened Portland's independent seaport. Writer, critic, and Atlantic & St. Lawrence Railroad (A&StL) co-founder, John Neal wrote of the necessity "to drive Boston out of the business and secure [a] monopoly." Poor promoted a separate system of Portland gauge railroads to funnel interior traffic to Portland in competition with the standard gauge railroads bringing traffic into the port of Boston. The Portland Company was organized in 1846 to build locomotives for the A&StL (with trains from India Street in Portland to Yarmouth in 1848 and ultimately to Montreal in 1859). Services to Auburn, Lewiston, and Waterville began in 1849 on lines of the original Maine Central (MEC) system that are now the (GRS) main line to Lewiston, Waterville and Bangor. The route to Brunswick opened in 1847 as a portion of the Kennebec & Portland Railroad which was subsequently subsumed by the MEC and GRS.

The Portland gauge railways north of Portland were converted to standard gauge in the 1870s. The line from the India Street station to Montreal remained independent as the Grand Trunk Railway while the remaining lines were consolidated as the Maine Central Railroad and came under the control of the Boston and Maine Railroad in 1884. Passenger service through Union Station emphasized connections to Boston until the New York, New Haven and Hartford Railroad introduced convenient long-distance train travel in 1913 with State of Maine overnight sleeping car service to Grand Central Terminal in New York City.

The July 1916 Portland, Maine streetcar strike was won by the union workers.

Railroad stations of Portland

Portland once boasted four passenger rail stations: Commercial Street and India Street (both on the waterfront), Preble Street on the north side, and Union Station to the west. In the early days, trains from the south on the PS&P terminated at Commercial Street south of Union Street, while Grand Trunk trains from the north terminated on the waterfront at India Street.

In 1873, when the B&M completed their line to Portland, their northern terminal (at ) on Saint John Street was named Portland Union Station. With the growth of the B&M, the Commercial Street terminal lost its prominence in the 1870s, and was abandoned in 1894. The Preble Street terminal was constructed to serve the Portland & Rochester (P&R), which eventually became the Worcester, Nashua, and Portland division of the Boston & Maine. It was abandoned in 1900, after which P&R trains were routed to Union Station. By the time the Grand Trunk opened a new terminal on its India Street site in 1903, Portland was down to two passenger stations: the B&M/MEC Portland Union Station on Saint John's Street, reconstructed in 1888, and the Grand Trunk Terminal on the waterfront at India Street.

The current Portland Transportation Center, serving Amtrak's Downeaster service, was constructed specifically for the Downeaster on the former Mountain Division of the Maine Central Railroad.

Railroad services in the Golden Era

Train service between Portland and Montreal began to decline following nationalization of the Grand Trunk into the Canadian National Railway in 1923. Ascendancy of the Maritimes was acknowledged when the Gull introduced international sleeping car service between Boston and Halifax through Portland in 1930. During the heyday of passenger rail in the 1920s, a variety of companies provided passenger rail services to Portland.

 Portland had two terminals: Union Station and the Grand Trunk's India Street Terminal. All passenger trains, except the two daily Grand Trunk trains to Montreal, operated in and out of Union Station, where switching services were provided by Portland Terminal Company.
 In the westbound direction, Portland had four "banks" of transfers: one in the early morning, one centered on noon, one at 5 pm, and one late at night. Union Station was relatively quiet in between those times.
 Schedules were generally designed to have trains leave Portland in the morning and arrive in the evening. The only notable exceptions were overnight services (MEC #8), the B&M evening connecting services to Boston (B&M #176, 250), and one single commuter-like train in the westbound direction (MEC #138/#44).
 In some cases, traveling to Lewiston required a change of train at Brunswick.
 The afternoon commuter-like trains in the eastbound direction resulted from heavy eastbound connecting traffic from the Boston & Maine. The fact that these trains fell within the commuter timeslot appears accidental.
 There is evidence in the schedule that the Grand Trunk deliberately discouraged commuter travel. GT #83 does not allow terminations in Lewiston, even though it is likely that the equipment moving from Lewiston to Lewiston Junction to meet #83 would have needed to run back empty to Lewiston after its tour of duty.
 Passenger service to Lewiston was unlikely to be competitive with the hourly service offered by the Portland-Lewiston Interurban.

How the lines worked

The service between Portland and Lewiston Junction (site of the Lewiston-Auburn airport) ran along the Atlantic & St. Lawrence mainline, which was constructed to Yarmouth in July 1848, then extended to Danville Junction (now Auburn) in November 1848, and reached Lewiston Junction in 1849. During the initial construction activity, an impressive wooden viaduct with a steel swing span was constructed to bridge Back Cove in Portland and India Street on the Portland peninsula. The bridge operated until 1984 when it was damaged by fire.

The Grand Trunk alignment from Yarmouth Junction to Lewiston Junction was initially constructed as a single-track mainline with passing sidings and was never double tracked. As the links were constructed all the way to Montreal, the Grand Trunk obtained a lease on the A&SL and operated that line until 1923 when bankruptcy forced a takeover by the Canadian National Railway. In 1984, following the bridge fire, the line was truncated at East Deering. Freight customers south of Back Cove were served through the Commercial Street connection with Guilford Rail System on the south side. In 1989, the line was purchased by a private owner and renamed the St. Lawrence & Atlantic (SLR). Today it is part of the Genesee & Wyoming group of short line railroads.

Yarmouth Junction is where the SLR route crosses at a diamond the old Kennebec & Portland (K&P) mainline to Brunswick, known today as Guilford Rail System’s “Brunswick Branch”.  The section of K&P in question was constructed in 1847 and was the earliest section of the K&P, reaching Bath in 1849. During the consolidation period in the 1870s, the K&P was acquired by the Maine Central.  Because of the higher population along the coast, the K&P route (known as the MEC “Lower Road”) once carried many express passenger trains.

Today, the remaining section of the Grand Trunk alignment south of the burned Back Cove Bridge is used by the Maine Narrow Gauge Railway and also survives as a pedestrian footpath/linear park. In 1981, the Maine Central was acquired by Guilford Rail System, which continues to operate limited freight services eastward to Brunswick

Direct service to New York City
From early in the 20th century, the B&M, in cooperation with the New Haven Railroad, ran the Bar Harbor Express and the State of Maine which provided direct service to New York City, bypassing Boston. The summer only Bar Harbor Express continued to Washington, D.C. The trains diverged from the main route to Boston at Lawrence, south of Haverhill, to proceed southwest. Both trains had their final runs in 1960.

The Flying Yankee

One of the most popular and busiest trains to be operated out of Portland was the Boston-Portland-Bangor "Flying Yankee" route which was run jointly by the MEC and Boston & Maine Railroads making three daily departures (two southbound and one northbound) from Portland Union Station. On April 1, 1935 this service was inaugurated with a then ground breaking diesel-powered stainless steel articulated streamline train set. Based at Portland, its three unit 142-seat integrated consist was the first such non-steam streamliner to enter service in North America east of the Mississippi, and just the third overall in the United States after the Chicago, Burlington and Quincy Railroad's almost identical "Pioneer Zephyr" (1934–1960) the Union Pacific Railroad's M-10000 (1934–1942).

The "Flying Yankee" covered about 730 total miles a day on its Monday through Saturday runs over a Portland-Boston-Portland-Bangor-Portland-Boston-Portland loop during which it reached speeds of up to 100 miles per hour. After a little over 23 years in operation during which the three unit train set traveled over five and a quarter million miles, the streamlined "Flying Yankee" made its final revenue runs on May 7, 1957 and was then retired from service. The Penobscot would continue serving the Bangor-Boston route to 1959.

Demise of the Portland passenger rail service

Passenger service on the P&R was completely abandoned in 1932. By 1954, the Maine Central was operating scheduled bus services between Lewiston and Portland in place of some trains, but for the trains that did run, the trip time was reduced from about 90 minutes in the 1920s to as low as 55 minutes. In 1954, Grand Trunk continued to operate one train daily to Portland and Lewiston from Montreal.

As passenger service declined, passenger facilities were deactivated. India Street lost its prominent tower in 1948, and the station itself was demolished in 1966. Union Station in Portland was razed in 1961, but its demolition spurred the beginning of Portland’s historic preservation movement.

In the twilight years of railroad-operated rail passenger service, the Gull, State of Maine, and all passenger service on the Maine Central (Portland-Bangor) ceased in 1960. The Lewiston service via the Maine Central was discontinued in the mid-1950s. The Boston & Maine ended its service between Boston and Portland in 1965 and, in 1967, the Grand Trunk Railway discontinued its once-weekly, summer-only Sunday service to and from Montreal, ending the last scheduled passenger service to Portland and Lewiston.

Revivals since 1980

Portland Downeaster
The Trainriders Northeast advocacy group was formed in Portland in 1989 with the initial goal of restarting passenger service from Massachusetts into Maine.  Starting in 1990, the State of Maine began active planning for the restoration of passenger rail service between Portland and Boston.  The Northern New England Passenger Rail Authority was formed in 1995 to manage the service.

The Amtrak Downeaster service began operating with four daily round trips to North Station in December 2001. In October 2007, following construction of additional passing tracks, the schedule was increased to five round trips on most days.

In Portland, the Downeaster terminates at an intermodal station with a large parking lot west of the Portland peninsula on GRS’s Mountain Division.

Brunswick
In June 1987, the State of Maine purchased the  Rockland Branch between Brunswick and Rockland and the Calais Branch from the Maine Central Railroad. Guilford serves few customers in Brunswick. East of Brunswick, the state recently refurbished the Rockland Branch to FRA Class 3 standards. The Maine Eastern Railroad was recently named to operate the railway with seasonal passenger excursions and limited freight traffic interchanging with Guilford in Brunswick.

As of January 2009, a plan was being discussed that would extend the Downeaster service to Brunswick via the Guilford (now Pan Am Railways) alignment by making a reverse move at the Portland Intermodal Transportation Center. The Downeaster arriving from Boston would platform at the station same way as it does now, change ends, and then travel over a yet-to-be constructed wye which would connect the former MEC Mountain Division to the Guilford main line, and thence to Brunswick.

On January 28, 2010, the Northern New England Passenger Rail Authority (NNEPRA) received approval for a $35 million grant from the federal government to fund track and signal upgrades for the Portland-Brunswick line. Pan Am Railways began work on the line in summer 2010. Service to Brunswick returned on November 1, 2012.

Ski train
In 1993, a seasonal winter service between East Deering and Bethel was to carry skiers to and from Bethel on the Grand Trunk alignment. However, due to unfavorable economics and that planned connecting passenger rail service to Boston had not materialized to support the ski train, the service was discontinued in 1997 after three years of operations.

Street cars

The Portland and Forest Avenue Railroad Company was chartered in 1860 to build a street car line from the India Street station of the Grand Trunk Railway.  Construction was delayed by the American Civil War; but used rail was obtained from New Brunswick in 1863 to complete a line from India Street along Middle Street through Monument Square along Congress Street, and then down High Street, and westerly along Spring Street to Clark Street.  Service with horse-drawn street cars began on 12 October 1863.  In 1864 an adjoining line was built along Preble Street from Monument Square and thence along Portland Street and Forest Avenue to Woodfords Corner.  This line was later extended to Morrills Corner along Pleasant Avenue and Stevens Avenue.  Lines along Congress Street were extended westward to Longfellow Square and eastward to Atlantic Street on Munjoy Hill.  Horse-drawn sleighs were substituted for rail cars when snow and ice covered the streets during winter months to avoid ice removal inconveniencing other horse-drawn sleighs.

The name was shortened to the Portland Railroad Company in 1865.  The Congress street line was extended past Union Station to Stroudwater Village.  A new line was built from Woodfords Corner through Lunts Corner to East Deering.  Additional lines were constructed along Commercial Street and Pearl Street from the Grand Trunk station to Congress Street.  Electrification through overhead wires began in the late 19th century, and the last horse-drawn car ran in December, 1895.  The Portland Railroad Company extended service through Westbrook to South Windham and Gorham by acquisition of the Westbrook, Windham and Naples Railway.  Connection with the Lewiston, Augusta and Waterville Street Railway at Yarmouth was made by acquisition of the Portland and Yarmouth Electric Railway through Falmouth Foreside and Cumberland Foreside.  Connection with the Biddeford and Saco Railway was made by acquisition of the Portland and Cape Elizabeth Railway through South Portland to Old Orchard and Saco.  From 1914 to 1933, the Portland–Lewiston Interurban entered Portland via the Portland Railroad line from Morrills Corner.

Increasing automobile ownership made electric railway travel less convenient through the 1920s.  The lines to Yarmouth, Gorham, South Windham, Old Orchard, and Saco were abandoned between 1931 and 1933.  The remaining system operated as a city traction system until a major service contraction in 1939 and complete replacement by buses in the spring of 1941.

See also
 Portland Transportation Center

References

 The Official Guide of the Railways and Steam Navigation Lines of the United States, Puerto Rico, Canada, Mexico and Cuba (Also Time-Tables of Railroads in Central America).  February 1926 edition.  Edited by E.S. Allen and A.J. Burns.  The National Railway Publication Company, Publishers and Proprietors. New York. 1926.  Reprinted by Cape Ann Train Company, Manchester, Massachusetts. 2001.
 The Rail Lines of Northern New England by Robert M. Lindsell. Branch Line Press Pepperell, Massachusetts.  2000.

Buildings and structures in Portland, Maine
Union stations in the United States
Boston and Maine Railroad
Railway stations in the United States opened in 1888
Railway stations in Maine
Rail transportation in Maine